Venator immansuetus is a wolf spider (i.e., in the Lycosidae family), endemic to Australia and found in the south-west of Western Australia.

It was first described in 1909 by Eugène Simon as Lycosa immansueta, and transferred to the genus, Venator by Volker Framenau in 2015.

References

External links 

 iNaturalist: Images of Venator immansuetus
ALA: Venator immansueta: images and occurrence data

Spiders described in 1909
Lycosidae
Spiders of Australia